This is a list of Jewish American composers. For listings of Jewish American songwriters, musicals writers, and film composers, see List of Jewish American musicians, which shares some names with this list. For other famous Jewish Americans, see List of Jewish Americans.

 Larry Adler (1914–2001), composer 
 Lera Auerbach (b. 1973), naturalized American, Russian-born composer
 Milton Babbitt (1916–2011), composer 
 Irving Berlin (1888–1989), composer and lyricist
 Leonard Bernstein (1918–1990), composer and conductor
 José Antonio Bowen (b. 1952), jazz musician and president of Goucher College
 David Burger composer of choral music, including Tefliah Lishlom Medinat Yisrael
 Aaron Copland (1900–1990), composer and conductor
 Morton Feldman (1926–1987), composer
 George Gershwin (1898–1937), composer and songwriter
 Philip Glass (b. 1937)
 Yossi Green (b. 1955), Hasidic Jewish composer of contemporary Jewish religious music
 Michael Isaacson, April 22, 1946 wikipedia

Bronisław Kaper (1902–1983), naturalized American film score composer of Polish-Jewish origin.
 Jerome Kern (1885–1945), composer and songwriter
 Fritz Kreisler (1875–1962), violinist and composer, one of the most famous of his day
 Leo Ornstein (1893–2002), modernist composer and pianist, Russian-born
 Tobias Picker (b. 1954), American composer, artistic director, and pianist
 Lou Reed (1942–2013), songwriter, composer and guitarist, a member of the Velvet Underground
 Steve Reich (b. 1937), composer
 Richard Rodgers (1902–1979), composer, songwriter, lyricist
 Arnold Schoenberg (1874–1951), naturalized American, Austrian-born composer
 Michael Jeffrey Shapiro (b. 1951), composer and conductor
 Nicolas Slonimsky (1894–1995), naturalized American, Russian-born composer, conductor and author
 Stephen Sondheim (1930–2021), composer and lyricist
 Morton Subotnick (b. 1933), composer of electronic and other music, husband to Joan LaBarbara
 Kurt Weill (1900–1950), naturalized American, German-born composer and songwriter, who wrote orchestral music and "show music"
 John Zorn (b. 1953), composer and saxophonist

References

Composers
Jewish
Jewish American